Callionymus muscatensis, the Muscat dragonet, is a species of dragonet native to the southern portions of the Red Sea and the Gulf of Oman. This species grows to a length of  TL.

References 

M
Fish described in 1905